The March 82S is a Sports 2000 prototype race car, designed, developed and built by British manufacturer March Engineering, for sports car racing, in 1982.

References

Sports prototypes